Xenagama wilmsi, the Wilms' agama, shield-tail agama, or turnip-tail agama, is a species of lizard in the family Agamidae. The species is endemic to the Horn of Africa.

Etymology 
The specific name, wilsmi, is in honor of Dr. Thomas M. Wilms "in recognition of his important contributions to North African and Arabian reptiles in general and the spiny-tailed agamid genera Uromastyx and Saara in particular".

Geographic range 
X. wilmsi is found in Ethiopia and Somalia.

Reproduction 
X. wilmsi is oviparous.

References 

wilmsi
Lizards of Africa
Reptiles of Ethiopia
Reptiles of Somalia
Reptiles described in 2013
Taxa named by Philipp Wagner
Taxa named by Aaron M. Bauer